Calhoun City is a town in Calhoun County, Mississippi, United States. The population was 1,774 at the 2010 census.

Geography
Calhoun City is located in south-central Calhoun County., and is bordered on the east by the town of Derma.

The Yalobusha River, a tributary of the Yazoo River, passes a mile south of the center of town.

Demographics

2020 census

As of the 2020 United States Census, there were 1,533 people, 709 households, and 436 families residing in the town.

2000 census
As of the census of 2000, there were 1,872 people, 736 households, and 530 families residing in the town. The population density was 789.1 people per square mile (305.0/km2). There were 827 housing units at an average density of 348.6 per square mile (134.7/km2). The racial makeup of the town was 66.72% Caucasian, 32.00% African American, 0.11% Native American, 0.05% Asian, 0.16% from other races, and 0.96% from two or more races. Hispanic or Latino of any race were 0.69% of the population.

There were 736 households, out of which 34.5% had children under the age of 18 living with them, 44.3% were married couples living together, 23.6% had a female householder with no husband present, and 27.9% were non-families. 26.4% of all households were made up of individuals, and 15.6% had someone living alone who was 65 years of age or older. The average household size was 2.38 and the average family size was 2.84.

In the town, the population was spread out, with 25.1% under the age of 18, 8.1% from 18 to 24, 23.2% from 25 to 44, 21.6% from 45 to 64, and 22.0% who were 65 years of age or older. The median age was 39 years. For every 100 females, there were 73.0 males. For every 100 females age 18 and over, there were 66.4 males.

The median income for a household in the town was $23,983, and the median income for a family was $28,047. Males had a median income of $27,917 versus $20,292 for females. The per capita income for the town was $14,294. About 23.2% of families and 25.2% of the population were below the poverty line, including 41.1% of those under age 18 and 16.9% of those age 65 or over.

Education
Calhoun City is served by the Calhoun County School District. Calhoun City High School's athletic teams are known as the Wildcats.

In 1968, Calhoun Academy was formed as a segregation academy by white parents seeking to avoid sending their children to racially integrated public schools. Its sports teams are known as the Cougars.

Notable people
 Ace Cannon, saxophone player and Mississippi Musicians Hall of Fame inductee
 Billy Cowan, former Major League Baseball player
 G. J. Higginbotham, former member of the Alabama House of Representatives and the Alabama State Senate
 M. D. Jennings, defensive back for the Green Bay Packers
 Vester Newcomb, former National Football League player and head football coach of University of Tennessee at Martin from 1978 to 1979
 Dave Parker, former Major League Baseball player
 Scott Suber, former Mississippi State first-team All-American
 Cornelius Wortham, former National Football League and Alabama Crimson Tide player
 Perry Van Bailey, member of the Mississippi House of Representatives (2023-present)

References

Towns in Calhoun County, Mississippi
Towns in Mississippi